BMDP was a statistical package developed in 1965 by Wilfrid Dixon at the University of California, Los Angeles.  The acronym stands for Bio-Medical Data Package, the word package was added by Dixon as the software consisted of a series of programs (subroutines) which performed different parametric and nonparametric statistical analyses.

BMDP was originally distributed for free. It was later sold by Statsols, who originally was a subsidiary of BMDP, but through a management buy-out formed the now independent company Statistical Solutions Ltd, known as Statsols. BMDP is no longer available . The company decided to only offer its other statistical product nQuery Sample Size Software.

References

External links 
 
Article on the Free Online Dictionary of Computing

Statistical software
Windows-only software
1960s software
Biostatistics